The 1972 All-Southwest Conference football team consists of American football players chosen, at each position, as the best players in the Southwest Conference during the 1972 NCAA University Division football season.  The selectors for the 1972 season included the Associated Press (AP), selected by the conference coaches, and the United Press International (UPI).

The AP also conducted balloting for coach of the year (Grant Teaff, Baylor), player of the year (running back Roosevelt Leaks of Texas), offensive player of the year (Leaks), defensive player of the year (defensive end Roger Goree of Baylor), and newcomer of the year (Leaks).

The UPI also conducted balloting for offensive player of the year (Leaks), defensive player of the year (Goree), sophomore player of the year (Leaks), and freshman player of the year (Wayne Morris, SMU). Two players were unanimous choices by the UPI voters: Leaks and offensive tackle Jerry Sisemore.

All Southwest selections

Offense

Quarterbacks
 Alan Lowry, Texas (AP-1, UPI-1)

Fullbacks
 Roosevelt Leaks, Texas (AP-1, UPI-1 [rb])

Running backs
 Dickey Morton, Arkansas (AP-1, UPI-1)
 Mike Luttrell, TCU (AP-1)
 Alvin Maxson, SMU (UPI-1)

Tight ends
 Gary Butler, Rice (AP-1, UPI-1)

Wide receivers
 Ed Collins, Rice (AP-1)
 Kenny Harrison, SMU (UPI-1 [split end])

Offensive tackles
 Jerry Sisemore, Texas (AP-1, UPI-1)
 Ron Waedemon, Rice (AP-1, UPI-1)

Offensive guards
 Travis Roach, Texas (AP-1, UPI-1)
 Guy Morriss, TCU (AP-1)
 Tom Reed, Arkansas (UPI-1)

Centers
 Russell Ingram, Texas Tech (AP-1, UPI-1)

Defense

Defensive ends
 Roger Goree, Baylor (AP-1, UPI-1)
 Malcolm Minnick, Texas (AP-1, UPI-1)

Defensive tackles
 Louis Kelcher, SMU (AP-1, UPI-1)
 Charlie Davis, TCU (AP-1, UPI-1)

Nose guard
 Donald Rives, Texas Tech (AP-1, UPI-1 [linebacker])

Linebackers
 Randy Braband, Texas (AP-1, UPI-1)
 Glen Gaspard, Texas (AP-1, UPI-1)
 Grady Hoermann, Texas A&M (AP-1)

Defensive backs
 Robert Popelka, SMU (AP-1, UPI-1)
 Bruce Henley, Rice (AP-1, UPI-1)
 Lyle Blackwood, TCU (AP-1, UPI-1)
 Robert Murski, Texas A&M (AP-1)
 Tommy Stewart, Baylor (UPI-1)

Key
AP = Associated Press

UPI = United Press International

See also
1972 College Football All-America Team

References

All-Southwest Conference
All-Southwest Conference football teams